Siliquaria, common name the slit worm snails, is a genus of sea snails, marine gastropod molluscs in the family Siliquariidae.

Siliquaria is the type genus of the family Siliquariidae.

Siliquaria is considered to be an objective synonym of Tenagodus Guettard, 1770 in World Register of Marine Species.

Species
Species in the genus Siliquaria include:
 Siliquaria muricata Born, 1780
 Siliquaria norai Bozzetti, 1998
The Indo-Pacific Molluscan Database also mentions the following species with names in current use ;
 Siliquaria bernardi Mörch, 1860
 Siliquaria chuni (Thiele, 1925)
 Siliquaria gigas Lesson, 1830
 Siliquaria reentzii (Mörch, 1865)
 Siliquaria scalariformis Mörch, 1861
Subgenus Siliquaria
 Siliquaria australis Quoy & Gaimard, 1834
 Siliquaria encausticus (Mörch, 1861)
 Siliquaria tostus (Mörch, 1861)

Synonymized species 
 Siliquaria anguina (Linnaeus, 1758): synonym of Tenagodus anguinus (Linnaeus, 1758)
 Siliquaria armata Kuroda, Habe & Kosuge, 1971: synonym of Tenagodus armatus (Habe & Kosuge, 1967)
 Siliquaria bipartita Martin, 1880: synonym of  Kuphus polythalamia (Linnaeus, 1758)
 Siliquaria cumingii Mörch, 1861: synonym of  Tenagodus cumingii (Mörch, 1861)
 Siliquaria lactea Lamarck, 1818: synonym of  Tenagodes lacteus Lamarck, 1818
 Siliquaria limonensis Olsson, 1922: synonym of Tenagodus modestus (Dall, 1881)
 Siliquaria maoria Powell, 1940: synonym of Tenagodus maoria (Powell, 1940)
 Siliquaria modesta Dall, 1881: synonym of Tenagodus modestus (Dall, 1881)
 Siliquaria norai Bozzetti, 1998: synonym of Tenagodus norai (Bozzetti, 1998)
 Siliquaria ponderosa Mörch, 1861: synonym of  Tenagodus ponderosus (Mörch, 1861)
 Siliquaria sculpturata Gabb, 1881: synonym of Tenagodus squamatus (Blainville, 1827)
 Siliquaria senegalensis (Mörch, 1860): synonym of  Tenagodus senegalensis (Récluz in Mörch, 1860)
 Siliquaria squamata Blainville, 1827: synonym of Tenagodus squamatus (Blainville, 1827)
 Siliquaria tahitensis (Mörch, 1861): synonym of Tenagodus tahitensis Mörch, 1861
 Siliquaria trochlearis (Mörch, 1860): synonym of  Tenagodes trochlearis (Mörch, 1861)
 Siliquaria weldii Tenison Woods, 1876: synonym of Tenagodus weldii Tenison-Woods, 1876

See also 
 Tenagodus

References

 Bruguière, Léon G. 1789. Encyclopédie méthodique. Histoire naturelle des Vers. Volume 1. 1-344. Panckouche & Plomteux. A. Bul. Paris & Liege. page(s): p.xv
 Vaught, K.C. (1989). A classification of the living Mollusca. American Malacologists: Melbourne, FL (USA). . XII, 195 pp
 Bieler, R., 1992 Tenagodus or Siliquaria? Unravelling taxonomic confusion in marine "worm-snails" (Cerithioidea: Siliquariidae). Nautilus 106, 1: 15-20. page(s): 15

Further reading 
 Powell A. W. B., New Zealand Mollusca, William Collins Publishers Ltd, Auckland, New Zealand 1979 

Siliquariidae